Anders Rambech (2 September 1767 – 14 September 1836) was a Norwegian district stipendiary magistrate and politician.

He was born at the mountain village of Kvikne in Tynset, Hedmark, Norway.  He worked as a clerk in the office of Magistrate of Orkdal in Sør-Trøndelag. In 1793,  he graduated with a law degree from the University of Copenhagen.  From 1800 he served as magistrate in Orkdal. When the copper mines in his home town was closed in 1812,  he arranged for assistance for the poor.
 
Anders Rambech represented Søndre Trondhjems amt at the Norwegian Constituent Assembly in 1814, and was elected to the Parliament in 1815, 1818, 1824 and 1827.

References

1767 births
1836 deaths
People from Tynset
Fathers of the Constitution of Norway
Members of the Storting